Yoo-gun is a Korean male given name.

People with this name include:
 Jo Jeong-ik (born 1983), stage name Yoo Gun, American-born South Korean actor

Fictional characters with this name include:
 Jung Yoo-gun, in 2013 South Korean television series Iris II

See also
List of Korean given names

References

Korean masculine given names